"Southern Nights" is a song written and performed by American musician Allen Toussaint, from his 1975 album, Southern Nights, and later recorded by American country music singer Glen Campbell. It was the first single released from Campbell's 1977 album, Southern Nights, and reached No. 1 on three separate US charts.

Song history
The lyrics of "Southern Nights" were inspired by childhood memories Allen Toussaint had of visiting relatives in the Louisiana backwoods, which often entailed storytelling under star-filled nighttime skies. When Campbell heard Toussaint's version, he immediately identified with the lyrics which reminded him of his own youth growing up on an Arkansas farm. In October 1976, Campbell recorded the song with slightly modified lyrics.

Accolades
In 1977, "Southern Nights" song was nominated for Song of the Year by the Country Music Association.

Chart performance
Released as a single by Campbell in January 1977, "Southern Nights" immediately caught on with both country and pop audiences.  The song featured a unique guitar lick that Campbell had learned from friend Jerry Reed. In late March, "Southern Nights" spent two weeks at No. 1 on the Billboard magazine Hot Country Singles chart marking it Campbell's fifth and final No. 1 country hit.

In late April, the track reached No. 1 on the Billboard Hot 100 pop chart marking Campbell's second and last No. 1 pop hit.

The song also spent four weeks at No. 1 on the Hot Adult Contemporary chart marking Campbell's seventh hit on the chart.

Weekly charts

Year-end charts

Certifications

In popular culture
The song is featured in the 2017 film Guardians of the Galaxy Vol. 2 and further included on the film's soundtrack album. Also included at the end of the TV show Claws, season 4 episode 9.

References

External links
 

1977 singles
Glen Campbell songs
Billboard Hot 100 number-one singles
Cashbox number-one singles
Songs written by Allen Toussaint
RPM Top Singles number-one singles
Capitol Records singles
1976 songs
Song recordings produced by Gary Klein (producer)
Songs about the American South
Songs about nights